Lauderdale, denoting "dale of the river Leader", is the dale and region around that river in south-eastern Scotland.

Lauderdale may also refer to:

People
Earl of Lauderdale
Lord Lauderdale, member of the Cabal Ministry of Charles II of England
Andrew Lauderdale (born 1993), American football player
Dallas Lauderdale, professional basketball player
Dwight Lauderdale, former TV news anchor
James Lauderdale, American military officer in the Creek War and War of 1812
Jim Lauderdale, singer-songwriter
Thomas Lauderdale, musician
Priest Lauderdale, former professional basketball player

Place names
Lauderdale, Tasmania, Australia
Lauderdale, Edmonton, Alberta, Canada, a residential neighbourhood
Lauderdale Tower, Barbican Estate, London, United Kingdom

United States
 Lauderdale, Louisiana, Allen Parish, Louisiana
 Lauderdale, Minnesota
 Lauderdale (Buchanan, Virginia)
 Lauderdale, Mississippi
 Lauderdale, Wisconsin
 Lauderdale County, Alabama
 Lauderdale County, Mississippi
 Lauderdale County, Tennessee
 Fort Lauderdale, Florida, and the surroundings:
 Lauderdale Lakes, Florida
 North Lauderdale, Florida
 Lauderdale-by-the-Sea, Florida

Other uses
Lauderdale (film), a movie on USA Up All Night